Camillus Union Free School is a building built in 1912 and 1913 in the Village of Camillus, New York.  It was listed on the National Register of Historic Places in 1991.

The original two-story school building has a U-shaped plan. It was designed by architect Eugene Sacket of Syracuse and was constructed in 1912 and 1913. A gymnasium was added in 1928 and an elementary-school wing was added in made in 1965. The original building was largely intact as of 1991, except for the loss of a cupola that was removed after a 1951 fire. The National Register listing includes the original building and the 1928 addition. The school was deemed architecturally significant as an example of a "small village school" built in the early decades of the 20th century.

It is located at First and LeRoy Streets, across a field from Nine Mile Creek.  Downstream is the Nine Mile Creek Aqueduct, another Registered Historic Place.

References

Buildings and structures in Onondaga County, New York
National Register of Historic Places in Onondaga County, New York
School buildings on the National Register of Historic Places in New York (state)